Kurdistan Expressway (Highway) is a North-South expressway in Tehran, Iran. It starts from Niayesh Expressway and passes Hemmat Expressway and Resalat Expressway, reaching Jala-e-Ale Ahamd Expressway and Shahid Gomnam Expressway.

 

Expressways in Tehran